Inverkeithing in Fife was a royal burgh that returned one commissioner to the Parliament of Scotland and to the Convention of Estates.

After the Acts of Union 1707, Inverkeithing, Culross, Dunfermline, Queensferry and Stirling formed the Stirling district of burghs, returning one member between them to the House of Commons of Great Britain.

List of burgh commissioners

 1661–63: Thomas Thomson. bailie 
1665 convention: not represented
 1667 convention, 1669–74, 1678 convention: Captain James Bennett, merchant 
 1681–82, 1685–86: John Dempster of Pitliver, provost 
 1689 convention, 1689–95: Alexander Spittell of Lewquhat  (died c.1696) 
 1696–1701, 1702–07: James Spittell, son of above, provost

References

See also
 List of constituencies in the Parliament of Scotland at the time of the Union

Burghs represented in the Parliament of Scotland (to 1707)
Politics of Fife
History of Fife
Constituencies disestablished in 1707
1707 disestablishments in Scotland